The 57th Cannes Film Festival started on 12 and ran until 23 May 2004. The Palme d'Or went to the American film Fahrenheit 9/11 by Michael Moore.

The festival opened with La mala educación, directed by Pedro Almodóvar and closed with De-Lovely, directed by Irwin Winkler. Laura Morante was mistress of the ceremonies.

Juries

Main competition
The following people were appointed as the Jury for the feature films of the 2004 Official Selection:
 Quentin Tarantino, Jury President
 Emmanuelle Béart
 Edwidge Danticat ( & )
 Tilda Swinton
 Kathleen Turner
 Benoît Poelvoorde
 Jerry Schatzberg
 Tsui Hark
 Peter von Bagh

Un Certain Regard
The following people were appointed as the Jury of the 2004 Un Certain Regard:
 Jeremy Thomas (producer) President
 Carlos Gomez (critic)
 Baba Richerme (journalist)
 Eric Libiot (critic)
 Eva Zaoralova (artistic director of the Karlovy Vary Festival)
 Michel Demopoulos (critic)

Cinéfondation and short films
The following people were appointed as the Jury of the Cinéfondation and short films competition:
 Nikita Mikhalkov (director) President
 Marisa Paredes (actress)
 Nicole Garcia (actress, director)
 Nuri Bilge Ceylan (director)
 Pablo Trapero (director)

Camera d'Or
The following people were appointed as the Jury of the 2004 Caméra d'Or:
 Tim Roth (actor, director) President
 Alain Choquart (cinematographer)
 Alberto Barbera (Director of museum)
 Aldo Tassone (critic)
 Anne Theron (director)
 Diego Galan (critic)
 Isabelle Frilley (representative of the technical industries)
 Laure Protat (cinephile)
 Nguyen Trong Binh (distributor)

Official selection

In competition - Feature film
The following feature films competed for the Palme d'Or: The Palme d'Or winner has been highlighted.

Un Certain Regard
The following films were selected for the competition of Un Certain Regard:

10 on Ten by Abbas Kiarostami
Alexandria... New York by Youssef Chahine
The Assassination of Richard Nixon by Niels Mueller
Crónicas by Sebastián Cordero
Dear Frankie by Shona Auerbach
Don't Move (Non ti muovere) by Sergio Castellitto
Earth and Ashes (Khakestar-o-khak) by Atiq Rahimi
Hotel by Jessica Hausner
In the Darkness of the Night (Noite Escura) by João Canijo
Kontroll by Antal Nimród
Lightweight (Poids léger) by Jean-Pierre Améris
Marseille by Angela Schanelec
Moolaadé by Ousmane Sembène
Nelly (À ce soir) by Laure Duthilleul
Passages (Lu cheng) by Yang Chao
Right Now (A Tout de Suite) by Benoît Jacquot
Shiza by Gulshat Omarova
Somersault by Cate Shortland
Sword in the Moon (Cheongpung myeongwol) by Kim Ui-seok
Welcome to Switzerland (Bienvenue en Suisse) by Léa Fazer
Whisky by Juan Pablo Rebella and Pablo Stoll

Films out of competition
The following films were selected to be screened out of competition:

 The 10th District Court: Moments of Trials (10e chambre - Instants d'audience) by Raymond Depardon
 Bad Education (La mala educación) by Pedro Almodóvar
 Bad Santa by Terry Zwigoff
 Born to Film (Cinéastes à tout prix) by Frédéric Sojcher
 Breaking News (Dà Shì Jiàn) by Johnnie To
 Dawn of the Dead by Zack Snyder
 De-Lovely by Irwin Winkler
 The Gate of Sun (Bab el shams) by Yousry Nasrallah
 Five by Abbas Kiarostami
 Glauber o Filme, Labirinto do Brasil by Silvio Tendler
 Henri Langlois: The Phantom of the Cinémathèque (Le fantôme d'Henri Langlois) by Jacques Richard
 House of Flying Daggers (Shí miàn mái fú) by Zhang Yimou
 I Died in Childhood... (...) by Georgi Paradzhanov
 Kill Bill: Vol. 2 by Quentin Tarantino
 Notre musique by Jean-Luc Godard
 Salvador Allende by Patricio Guzmán
 Troy by Wolfgang Petersen
 Words in Progress (Épreuves d'artistes) by Gilles Jacob
 Z Channel: A Magnificent Obsession by Alexandra Cassavetes

Cinéfondation
The following short films were selected for the competition of Cinéfondation:

 99 ans de ma vie by Marja Mikkonen
 Beita Shel Meshoreret by Haim Tabakman
 Calatorie la oras by Corneliu Porumboiu
 Fajnie, że jesteś by Jan Komasa
 Footnote by Pia Borg
 Gaia by Amarante Abramovici
 Happy Now by Frederikke Aspöck
 Kis Apokrif N°2 by Kornél Mundruczó
 Kontakt by Martin Duda
 Nebraska by Olga Żurawska
 Playing Dead by David Hunt
 Propheties du passe by Fabien Greenberg
 Proyect Gvul by Tamar Singer, Dani Rosenberg, Nadav Lapid, Adi Halfin, Rima Essa
 Son Of Satan by Jj Villard
 The Happiness Thief by Derek Boyes
 The Rick by Tim McCarthy
 The Wings by Hae-young Seo
 Wonderful Harusame by Ayumi Aoyama

Short film competition
The following short films competed for the Short Film Palme d'Or:

 Accordeon by Michèle Cournoyer
 Closer by David Rittey
 Flatlife by Jonas Geirnaert
 Gérard mon amour by Madeleine Andre
 L'evangile du cochon creole by Michelange Quay
 La derniere minute by Nicolas Salis
 Le nageur by Klaus Huettmann
 Quimera by Eryk Rocha
 Thinning the Herd by Rie Rasmussen
 Trafic by Cătălin Mitulescu

Cannes Classics
For the third year, the Cannes Festival selected "some of world cinema's masterpieces and rarities" for the audience. The following films were projected in the "Salle Buñuel" during the festival.

Tribute

Black God, White Devil (Deus e o diabo na terra do sol) by Glauber Rocha (1964)
Blowup by Michelangelo Antonioni (1966)
Bye Bye Brazil by Carlos Diegues (1979)
College by James W. Horne (1927)
Dona Flor and Her Two Husbands (Dona Flor e seus dois maridos) by Bruno Barreto (1976)
Entranced Earth (Terra em transe) by Glauber Rocha (1967)
The Gaze of Michelangelo (Lo sguardo di Michelangelo) by Michelangelo Antonioni (short)
The General by Buster Keaton and Clyde Bruckman (1926)
Macunaíma by Joaquim Pedro de Andrade (1968)
O Pagador de Promessas by Anselmo Duarte (1964)
Steamboat Bill, Jr. by Buster Keaton and Charles Reisner (1928)
Vidas Secas by Nelson Pereira dos Santos (1963)

Restored Prints

The Battle of Algiers by Gillo Pontecorvo (1965)
Before the Revolution (Prima della rivoluzione) by Bernardo Bertolucci (1964)
The Big Red One by Samuel Fuller (1980)
Deadlier Than the Male by Ralph Thomas (1966)
Hair by Miloš Forman (1979)
The Inner Scar (La cicatrice intérieure) by Philippe Garrel (1967)
The Loneliness of the Long Distance Runner by Tony Richardson (1962)
Mother India by Mehboob Khan (1957)
The New One-Armed Swordsman (San duk bei do) by Chang Cheh (1971)
Ordet by Carl Theodor Dreyer (1955)
Pickpocket by Robert Bresson (1959)
Le voyage d'Amélie by Daniel Duval (1974)

Parallel sections

International Critics' Week
The following films were screened for the 43rd International Critics' Week (43e Semaine de la Critique):

Feature film competition

 À Casablanca les anges ne volent pas by Mohamed Asli (Morocco, Italy)
 Thirst (Atash) by Tawfik Abu Wael (Israel, Palestine)
 A Common Thread (Brodeuses) by Éléonore Faucher (France)
 Calvaire by Fabrice Du Welz (Belgium, France, Luxembourg)
 CQ2 (Seek You Too) by Carole Laure (Canada, France)
 Or (My Treasure) (Or) by Keren Yedaya (France, Israel)
 Duck season (Temporada de patos) by Fernando Eimbcke (Mexico)

Short film competition

 Alice and I (Alice et moi) by Micha Wald (Belgium)
 Breaking Out by Marianela Maldonado (United States)
 Con Diva (With Diva) by Sebastian Mantilla (Spain)
 L’homme sans ombre by Georges Schwizgebel (Canada, Switzerland)
 Los elefantes nunca olvidan by Lorenzo Vigas (Venezuela, Mexico)
 Ryan by Chris Landreth (Canada)
 Signes de vie by Arnaud Demuynck (France, Belgium)

Special screenings

 L’Après-midi de Monsieur Andesmas by Michelle Porte (France) (opening film)
 Adieu Philippine by Jacques Rozier (France) (La séance du Parrain)
 Ce qu’il reste de nous by François Prévost & Hugo Latulippe (Canada) (Docu.)
 Metropolitan Express (Stolitchny Skory) by Artyom Antonov (Russia) (Short)
 Les Parallèles by Nicolas Saada (France) (Short)
 Girls and Cars by Thomas Woschitz (Austria) (Short)
 De l'autre côté by Nassim Amaouche (France) (Prix de la Critique)
 Anna (3 kgs 2) by Laurette Polmanss (France) (Prix de la Critique)
 Sotto falso nome by Roberto Andò (Italy, France, Switzerland) (closing film)

Directors' Fortnight
The following films were screened for the 2004 Directors' Fortnight (Quinzaine des Réalizateurs): 

 A vot' bon cœur by Paul Vecchiali (France)
 Dans les champs de bataille by Danielle Arbid (France, Belgium, Lebanon)
 En attendant le déluge by Damien Odoul (France)
 The Heart Is Deceitful Above All Things (Le livre de Jérémie) by Asia Argento (United States, France, United Kingdom, Japan)
 The Hook (Je suis un assassin) by Thomas Vincent (France)
 Mean Creek by Jacob Aaron Estes (United States)
 Machuca by Andrés Wood (France, Spain, Chile)
 Los muertos by Lisandro Alonso (Argentina, France, Netherlands, Switzerland)
 Mur (doc.) by Simone Bitton (France, Israel)
 Oh, Uomo (doc.) by Yervant Gianikian, Angela Ricci Lucchi (Italy)
 The River's End by Behrouz Afkhami (Iran)
 The Scent of Blood (L'odore del sangue) by Mario Martone (Italy, France)
 Sommeil Amer by Mohsen Amiryoussefi (Iran)
 Tarnation (doc.) by Jonathan Caouette (United States)
 The Taste of Tea by Katsuhito Ishii (Japan)
 The Tunnel by Kunitoshi Manda (Japan)
 Vénus et Fleur by Emmanuel Mouret (France)
 Woman of Breakwater by Mario O'Hara (Philippines)
 The Woodsman by Nicole Kassell (United States)
 The Wound (La blessure) by Nicolas Klotz (France, Belgium)

Short films

 A Feather Stare at the Dark by Naoyuki Tsuji (Japan)
 Capitaine Achab by Philippe Ramos (France)
 Charlotte by Ulrike Von Ribbeck (Germany)
 Fill in the Blanks by Kim Youn-Sung (South Korea)
 Frontier by Jun Miyazaki (Japan)
 La petite chambre by Élodie Monlibert (France)
 La peur, petit chasseur by Laurent Achard (France)
 Le dieu Saturne by Jean-Charles Fitoussi (France)
 Le droit chemin by Mathias Gokalp (France)
 Odya by Edgar Bartenev (Russia)
 Tristesse beau visage by Jean Paul Civeyrac (France)
 Vostok 1 by Jan Andersen (France)

Awards

Official awards
The following films and people received the 2004 Official selection awards:
 Palme d'Or: Fahrenheit 9/11, by Michael Moore
 Grand Prix: Oldboy, by Park Chan-wook
 Best Director Award: Exils, by Tony Gatlif
 Best Screenplay Award: Agnès Jaoui and Jean-Pierre Bacri for Look at Me
 Best Actress: Maggie Cheung in Clean
 Best Actor: Yūya Yagira in Nobody Knows
 Prix du Jury: 
 Tropical Malady, by Apichatpong Weerasethakul
 Actress Irma P. Hall for The LadykillersUn Certain Regard Prix Un Certain Regard: Moolaadé by Ousmane Sembène
 Prix du Regard Original: Whisky by Juan Pablo Rebella and Pablo Stoll
 Prix du Regard vers l'Avenir: Earth and Ashes (Khakestar-o-khak) by Atiq RahimiCinéfondation First Prize: Happy Now by Frederikke Aspöck
 Second Prize: Calatorie la oras by Corneliu Porumboiu & 99 ans de ma vie by Marja Mikkonen
 Third Prize: Fajnie, że jesteś by Jan KomasaGolden Camera Caméra d'Or: Or (My Treasure) (Or) by Keren Yedaya
 Caméra d'Or - Special Distinction: Passages (Lu cheng) by Yang Chao & Earth and Ashes (Khakestar-o-khak) by Atiq RahimiShort films Short Film Palme d'Or: Trafic by Cătălin Mitulescu
 Short Film Jury Prize: Flatlife by Jonas Geirnaert

Independent awardsFIPRESCI Prizes Fahrenheit 9/11 by Michael Moore (In competition)
 Whisky by Juan Pablo Rebella and Pablo Stoll (Un Certain Regard)
 Thirst (Atash) by Tawfik Abu Wael (International Critics' Week)Vulcan Award of the Technical Artist Vulcan Award: Éric Gautier for cinematography in Clean and in The Motorcycle DiariesEcumenical Jury Prize of the Ecumenical Jury: The Motorcycle Diaries by Walter Salles
 Ecumenical Jury - Special mention: Moolaadé by Ousmane SembèneAward of the Youth Kontroll by Antal NimródAwards in the frame of International Critics' Week International Critics' Week Grand Prix: A Common Thread (Brodeuses) by Éléonore Faucher & Or (My Treasure) (Or) by Keren Yedaya
 Canal+ Award: Ryan by Chris Landreth
 Kodak Short Film Award: Ryan by Chris Landreth
 Young Critics Award - Best Short: Ryan by Chris Landreth
 Young Critics Award - Best Feature: Or (My Treasure) (Or) by Keren Yedaya
 Grand Golden Rail: CQ2 (Seek You Too) by Carole Laure
 Small Golden Rail: Alice and I (Alice et moi) by Micha WaldAssociation Prix François Chalais'''
 François Chalais Award: The Motorcycle Diaries'' by Walter Salles

References

Media
INA: Opening of the 2004 Festival (commentary in French)
INA: Much publicity about the 2004 Palme d'Or (commentary in French)

External links

2004 Cannes Film Festival (web.archive)
Official website Retrospective 2004 
Cannes Film Festival Awards for 2004 at Internet Movie Database

Cannes Film Festival
Cannes Film Festival
Cannes Film Festival
Cannes Film Festival
Cannes Film Festival
Cannes Film Festival